Justin Jacob Long (born June 2, 1978) is an American actor, comedian, director and screenwriter. Long is known for his film roles particularly in comedy and horror films, notably appearing in Jeepers Creepers (2001),  Dodgeball (2004), Accepted (2006), Idiocracy (2006), Dreamland (2006), Live Free or Die Hard (2007), Zack and Miri Make a Porno (2008), Drag Me to Hell (2009), Tusk (2014), The Wave (2019), and Barbarian (2022) as well as voicing Alvin Seville in the live-action Alvin and the Chipmunks film series. He is also known for his television appearances in Ed (2000–2004) and F is for Family (2015–2021). He appeared alongside John Hodgman in TV commercials for Apple's "Get a Mac" campaign, and as himself in Intel's "Go PC" campaign.

Early life
Long was born the middle of three boys in Fairfield, Connecticut, to father R. James Long, a philosophy and Latin professor at Fairfield University, and mother Wendy Lesniak, a former actress who has mostly appeared on stage. His grandmother was of Italian descent. Long had a "kind of conservative" Catholic upbringing. His older brother, Damian, is a local stage actor and teacher at Weston High School. Long attended Fairfield College Preparatory School, a Jesuit institution, and Vassar College, where he was a member of the sketch comedy group Laughingstock and starred in several plays, including Butterflies Are Free.

Career

Long's film credits include Idiocracy, Waiting..., Jeepers Creepers,  DodgeBall: A True Underdog Story, The Break-Up, Crossroads, Galaxy Quest, Dreamland and Live Free or Die Hard. He was also a regular on the NBC TV series Ed (2000–04), playing socially awkward Warren P. Cheswick. He was offered the opportunity to replace Steve Burns on Blue's Clues after he left the show, but ultimately declined. He was the voice of the character Alvin in Alvin and the Chipmunks, Alvin and the Chipmunks: The Squeakquel, Alvin and the Chipmunks: Chipwrecked, and Alvin and the Chipmunks: The Road Chip. He also played the main character in the comedy film Accepted (2006).

Long made a guest appearance in the documentary, Wild West Comedy Show (2006). In 2007, he co-starred with Bruce Willis as a white-hat hacker in Live Free or Die Hard and had a role in the comedy The Sasquatch Gang.
Long is known for his depiction of a Mac in Apple's "Get a Mac" campaign. The campaign featured commercials in which Long as a Mac and John Hodgman as a PC engaged in playful banter about "the strengths of the Mac platform and weaknesses of the PC platform."

Long also had a small role in the comedy film Zack and Miri Make a Porno (2008), where he plays Brandon St. Randy, a gay porn star. In 2009, he starred in He's Just Not That Into You along with co-star Ginnifer Goodwin and After.Life opposite Liam Neeson and Christina Ricci. He also provided the voice of Humphrey in Alpha and Omega (2010), starring with Hayden Panettiere. Also in 2010, Long starred in the comedy film Going the Distance with Drew Barrymore. He was cast as a one-armed Civil War veteran in Robert Redford's The Conspirator.

Long read the audiobook version of Judy Blume's Then Again, Maybe I Won't and Stephen King's Everything's Eventual. From July 7–18, 2010, he appeared in a production of Samuel J. and K. at the Williamstown Theatre Festival. On August 16, 2010, he co-hosted WWE Raw with Going the Distance co-stars Charlie Day and Jason Sudeikis at the Staples Center in Los Angeles.
In 2014 he starred in the independent love drama Comet, which he and his co-star Emmy Rossum also produced. He also was in a few skits on the show ‘Inside Amy Schumer’. In April 2019, Long started the podcast, Life Is Short with Justin Long, with its introductory episode airing through Wondery on April 29, 2019. His first guest was actor Dax Shepard.

On June 24, 2019, Long, along with an ensemble cast, presented The Investigation: A Search for the Truth in Ten Acts, a dramatic reading of Special Counsel Robert S. Mueller III's Report on the Investigation into Russian Interference in the 2016 Presidential Election. Long portrayed former Director of the Federal Bureau of Investigation James Comey. In 2020, he appeared in the reality television series Celebrity Watch Party alongside his younger brother Christian Long. He appeared in commercials for Intel's "Go  PC" campaign.

Personal life
Long  had a relationship with Drew Barrymore that was on and off between 2007 and 2010. He also dated Amanda Seyfried from mid-2013, breaking up in September 2015.

During an episode of the podcast
Armchair Expert with Dax Shepard, Long revealed that he was the victim of a drugging and abduction during the filming of Youth In Revolt while in Michigan. According to Long, after an evening of drinking he left with several local individuals who offered him marijuana but, he believes that it was actually  Phencyclidine, more commonly known as PCP. After getting him severely intoxicated, these individuals took him to various locations against his will and avoided taking him to his hotel as he repeatedly requested. According to Long, the individuals made reference to filming him while high on hard drugs and selling the footage to TMZ or another website dedicated to celebrity gossip. Long was so concerned that he eventually leapt from the moving vehicle in order to escape the ordeal. Long commented that he has faced lingering nerve damage in his leg due to the injuries he sustained in escaping from their car.

Long is a political liberal. He supported Barack Obama during the 2012 U.S. presidential election and was an outspoken critic of the Republican nominee Mitt Romney, describing him as a "modern-day Gordon Gekko". Long endorsed Senator Bernie Sanders for President in the 2016 U.S. presidential election. He endorsed Sanders again in the 2020 Democratic primary, has been seen at Sanders rallies, and has appeared on the campaign trail as a surrogate.

As of January 2022, Long is in a relationship with actress Kate Bosworth.

Filmography

Film

Television

References

External links

 
 Video interview with Justin Long at the premiere of The Break-Up

1978 births
American writers of Italian descent
20th-century American male actors
21st-century American male actors
American male film actors
American male television actors
American male voice actors
American male screenwriters
Sacred Heart University faculty
Vassar College alumni
Living people
Actors from Fairfield, Connecticut
Male actors from Connecticut
Fairfield College Preparatory School alumni
Frat Pack